Erin Kennedy  (née Wysocki-Jones; born 5 August 1992) is a British Paralympic coxswain is a double World Champion, European Champion and World Record Holder in the mixed coxed four.

Erin and her crew, consisting of Oliver Stanhope, Ellen Buttrick, Giedrė Rakauskaitė and James Fox set a new World Best Time at the 2019 World Rowing Championships in Linz Ottensheim in the PR3 Mix 4+ of 6:48.24 whilst also claiming a Qualification place for Tokyo 2020. The crew now hold the Guinness World Record for the fastest row in the PR3 Mix 4+ and were featured in the 2021 Book of Guinness World Records.

In 2021, the crew reformed for the European Rowing Championships in Varese, Italy. The Great Britain team topped the medal table and Erin and her crew finished in first place, becoming European Champions for the first time.

Kennedy was appointed Member of the Order of the British Empire (MBE) in the 2022 New Year Honours for services to rowing.

References

1992 births
Living people
People from Wantage
Paralympic rowers of Great Britain
British female rowers
Rowers at the 2020 Summer Paralympics
Medalists at the 2020 Summer Paralympics
Paralympic medalists in rowing
Paralympic gold medalists for Great Britain
Sportspeople from Plymouth, Devon
Members of the Order of the British Empire
Alumni of Pembroke College, Oxford